Pierre Halet (27 October 1924 – 27 January 1996) was a French writer, poet, and dramatist. His complete works have been published in five volumes by Les éditions La Simarre 

His theater plays have often been performed. His play Little Boy, was used as a base for the piece. Computer suite for Little Boy by Jean-Claude Risset, first classical musical work fully synthesized by a computer.

Works 
Contes, éditions La Simarre 2013

Theatre 
 Le Cheval Caillou, created by the Comédie de Bourges en 1965 (Maison de la Culture de Bourges)
 La Provocation, created by the Comédie de Bourges
 La Butte de Satory  Éditions du Seuil, Paris, 1967
 Little boy Éditions du Seuil, Paris, 1968
 La Double migration de Job Cardoso Éditions du Seuil, Paris, 1970
 See Brant, created in 1980 at the TJP in Strasbourg
 Au loin, le bruit de la mer  Éditions Domens

References

Bibliography 
 Balade en région Centre, sur les pas des écrivains (collectif) Éditions Alexandrines, 2012,

External links 
 Bibliothèque Nationale de France 
 
 INA 

20th-century French dramatists and playwrights
20th-century French poets
1924 births
1996 deaths